Miltsevo is a rural locality (a village) in Posyolok Mezinovsky, Gus-Khrustalny District, Vladimir Oblast, Russia. The population was 29 as of 2010.

Geography 
Miltsevo is located 30 km southwest of Gus-Khrustalny (the district's administrative centre) by road. Torfoprodukt is the nearest rural locality.

References 

Rural localities in Gus-Khrustalny District